is a single released by Gackt on October 27, 2004 under Nippon Crown. It peaked at second place on the Oricon weekly chart and charted for seventeen weeks. In 2004, it was the 96th best selling single of the year, with sales of 98,335 copies. It ultimately sold 124,280 copies, making it Gackt's ninth best selling single. It was certified gold by RIAJ.

Track listing

References

2004 singles
Gackt songs
Pop-folk songs
2004 songs